Giorgos Perdikis (born 23 March 1962) is a Cypriot politician who was the leader of the Cyprus Green Party from 2014 to 2020 and is a Member of the House of Representatives since 2001.

Perdikis studied civil engineering at the Aristotle University of Thessaloniki. He is married and has two sons.

References

Living people
Year of birth missing (living people)
Members of the House of Representatives (Cyprus)
Movement of Ecologists — Citizens' Cooperation politicians